Tao Ruspoli (born 7 November 1975) is an Italian-American filmmaker, photographer, musician, and co-founder of The Bombay Beach Biennale.

Early life
Ruspoli was born in Bangkok, Thailand, and raised in Rome, Italy and Los Angeles, California, United States. He is the second son of occasional actor and aristocrat Prince Alessandro Ruspoli, 9th Prince of Cerveteri and Austrian-American actress Debra Berger. He is the older brother of Bartolomeo  Ruspoli (born 6 October 1978 in Rome), second husband of oil heiress Aileen Getty. His half-siblings include Francesco Ruspoli, 10th Prince of Cerveteri, Melusine Ruspoli, and Theodoro Ruspoli.

He graduated with a degree in philosophy from the University of California, Berkeley in 1998.

Career
Ruspoli's feature narrative début, Fix, was one of 10 feature films to screen in competition at the 2008 Slamdance Film Festival and soon afterward at the Santa Barbara International Film Festival, where Ruspoli was awarded the Heineken Red Star Award for "most innovative and progressive filmmaker". Fix also won the Festival Award for Best Film at the 2008 Brooklyn Film Festival, Vail Film Festival and the 2008 Twin Rivers Media Festival, as well as other prizes at several international festivals.

His most well-known documentaries are Being in the World, an exploration of the real world implications of the philosophical work of Martin Heidegger, and Monogamish starring Dan Savage, Esther Perel and Christopher Ryan. His other films include  Just Say Know, a personal discussion of his family's drug addictions, and Flamenco: A Personal Journey, a feature-length documentary about the flamenco way of life as it is lived by Roma in the south of Spain. He has directed a number of other short documentaries, including El Cable (also about flamenco), and This Film Needs No Title: A Portrait of Raymond Smullyan, a portrait of the logician, mathematician and concert pianist Raymond Smullyan).

In 2000, Ruspoli founded LAFCO, the Los Angeles Filmmakers Cooperative, which is a bohemian collective of filmmakers and musicians who work out of a converted school bus. Through LAFCO, Ruspoli has produced several films. His producing credits include the feature film Camjackers, which he also acted in and co-edited. Camjackers won the editing award at the 44th Ann Arbor Film Festival.

Tao is an accomplished flamenco guitar player and co-founder of the Bombay Beach Biennale.

Personal life
Ruspoli married actress Olivia Wilde on 7 June 2003 in Washington, Virginia. On 8 February 2011, they announced that they were separating. Wilde filed for divorce in Los Angeles County Superior Court on 3 March 2011, citing "irreconcilable differences". The divorce was finalized on 29 September 2011. Wilde did not seek spousal support, and the pair reached a private agreement on property division.

Since 2009, he has lived and worked in Venice, Los Angeles, as a photographer and filmmaker.

Filmography
 Just Say Know (2002) Director, Cinematographer and Film editor
 This Film Needs No Title: A Portrait of Raymond Smullyan (2004) Director, Cinematographer and Film editor
 El Cable (2004) Director, Cinematographer, Editor and Film producer
 Flamenco: A Personal Journey (2005) Director, Cinematographer and Film producer
 Camjackers (2006) Whack Filmmaker No. 1 and also Film editor and Executive Producer
 Fix (2008) Writer, Cinematographer, director, and Actor (as Milo)
 Behind the Wheel (film)|Behind the Wheel (2008) Film director
 Being in the World (2009) Film director
 Monogamish (film)|Monogamish (2017) Film director

Recordings
 Flamenco, (Mapleshade, 2005)

References

External links
 
 

1975 births
Living people
American people of Austrian descent
American people of Italian descent
Tao
Italian untitled nobility
Tao Ruspoli
University of California, Berkeley alumni
People from Venice, Los Angeles
Film directors from Los Angeles